Protein FAM50A is a protein that in humans is encoded by the FAM50A gene.

References

Further reading